Adamović is a Serbian and Croatian surname, a patronymic derived from Adam. It may refer to:

 Draginja Adamović (1925–2000), Serbian poet
 Dušan Adamović (1893-1975), Serbian painter
 Duško Adamović (born 1973), Serbian footballer
 Filip Adamović (born 1988), Bosnian basketball player
 Goran Adamović (born 1987), Serbian footballer
 Lujo Adamović (1864–1935), Serbian botanist
 Marko Adamović (born 1991), Serbian footballer
 Miloš Adamović (born 1979), Serbian footballer
 Nenad Adamović (born 1989), Serbian footballer
 Ratko Adamović (born 1942), Serbian writer
 Vicko Adamović (1838-1919), Serbian pedagogue and historian
 Zdenko Adamović (born 1963), Croatian footballer

References 

Serbian surnames
Croatian surnames